The Stappogiedde Formation is a geologic formation in Norway. It preserves fossils dating back to the Ediacaran period.

See also

 List of fossiliferous stratigraphic units in Norway

References
 

Ediacaran Norway
Ediacaran geology